Darko Đurić (born 11 September 1989) is a retired Slovenian Paralympic swimmer who competed at international elite competitions. He is a double World champion and European champion in freestyle swimming.

References

1989 births
Living people
Sportspeople from Maribor
Paralympic swimmers of Slovenia
Swimmers at the 2012 Summer Paralympics
Swimmers at the 2016 Summer Paralympics
Medalists at the World Para Swimming Championships
Medalists at the World Para Swimming European Championships
Slovenian male freestyle swimmers
S4-classified Paralympic swimmers